Hohenberg-Krusemark is a municipality in the district of Stendal, in Saxony-Anhalt, Germany. It is about 17 km (10 miles) North East of the town Stendal.

Geography 
The municipality consists of the following 10 divisions (Ortsteile):

 Altenzaun
 Gethlingen
 Groß Ellingen
 Hindenburg (incl. Klein Hindenburg)
 Hohenberg-Krusemark
 Klein Ellingen
 Osterholz
 Rosenhof
 Schwarzholz

History 
On October 17, 1928, the Hohenberg estate district was merged with the Krusemark estate district and the rural municipalities of Hohenberg and Krusemark to form a rural municipality of Hohenberg-Krusemark. The municipality of Hohenberg-Krusemark was reorganized on July 25, 1952 from the district of Osterburg to the district of Osterburg. After its dissolution it became part of the district of Stendal on July 1, 1994.

On December 31, 2008 the community of Hindenburg was incorporated, on January 1, 2009 the community of Altenzaun and on September 1, 2010 the community of Schwarzholz was incorporated.

Politics

Municipal Council 
The municipal elections on May 26, 2019, produced the following result:

 four seats Voter group "Per Region
 four seats CDU
 two seats single applicants

Four of the 10 municipal councillors are women.

Partnerships 
Hohenberg-Krusemark is a partner municipality of Ellingen in Bavaria, initiated in 1989 after the opening of the border by the volunteer fire departments of Groß Ellingen and Ellingen in Bavaria. Furthermore, the local community Straßenhaus of the association community Rengsdorf-Waldbreitbach in Rhineland-Palatinate is a partner community of Hohenberg-Krusemark.

Culture

Sports 
Hohenberg-Krusemark was already a center of the horse sport at the time of the GDR. Every year, riding events are held here, especially in the areas of eventing and rural riding, which are organized by the equestrian sports club founded in 1881.

Associations 
In Hohenberg-Krusemark there is an active club life which consists of the Heimatverein, the Interessenverein "Sternreiten in der Altmark" e.V., the Dorfentwicklungsverein, the Pferdesportverein "1881" Hohenberg-Krusemark e.V. and the Kulturförderverein "Östliche Altmark".

Religion 
The 2011 European Union census showed that of the 1296 inhabitants of the municipality of Hohenberg-Krusemark, about 23% belonged to the Protestant and about 3% to the Catholic Church. The protestant village church of Krusemark is from the 12th century and is the oldest preserved building in the region.

References

Municipalities in Saxony-Anhalt
Stendal (district)